Death Trip is a 2014 Chinese-Thai suspense thriller film directed by Liu Chen and Tian Li. It was released on December 26.

Cast
Van Fan
Li Xinyun
Li Yuan
Xue Cun

Reception
By December 26, 2014, the film had earned ¥1.27 million at the Chinese box office.

References

2010s thriller films
Chinese thriller films
Thai thriller films
Chinese suspense films